Topik or topig (Armenian: Թոփիկ) is an Armenian dish, sometimes thought of as a vegetarian meatball, consisting of a chickpea- based paste, usually mixed with potatoes or flour, surrounding a filling of onions, nuts, and currants, and flavored with herbs, spices, and tahini.

Topik is primarily a Lenten dish and is often served at Michink (the middle of Lent).

References

External links
Ingredients and preparation of Topik

Armenian cuisine
Meatballs
Chickpea dishes